Templenagalliaghdoo is a medieval church and National Monument in County Mayo, Ireland.

Location

Templenagalliaghdoo is located on a peninsula stretching into Lough Conn, immediately to the north of Errew Abbey.

History

The name means "Church of the Black Nun." This church was built on the site of a previous church founded in the 6th century; it may have been an oratory or nunnery.

Buildings

Templenagalliaghdoo is a small rectangular building with walls 50 cm thick and an entrance in the southwest, surrounded by a dry stone wall enclosure (17 × 23 m).

References

External links

Religion in County Mayo
Archaeological sites in County Mayo
National Monuments in County Mayo
Former churches in the Republic of Ireland